Giovane Farinazzo Gavio (born September 7, 1970 in Juiz de Fora), known as Giovane, is a retired Brazilian volleyball coach and former player, who was a member of the Brazil men's national volleyball team that won the gold medal at the 1992 Summer Olympics in Barcelona, Spain by defeating The Netherlands (3-0) in the final.

Playing as an outside hitter, Gavio competed in three consecutive Summer Olympics, starting in 1992. Later on he started a career in beach volleyball. As of the present day, he is the head coach of Superliga's most recent champions, SESI São Paulo. He is the only Brazilian player (and second overall, after Javier Weber) to win the Superliga both as player and coach.

Individual awards
 1989 FIVB World Cup "Best Blocker"
 1993 FIVB World League "Most Valuable Player"
 2003 FIVB World Cup "Best Spiker"

External links
 
 
 Profile at geocities.com/volleyballplus
 Profile at esporte.uol.com.br 
  

1970 births
Living people
Brazilian men's volleyball players
Brazilian men's beach volleyball players
Volleyball players at the 1992 Summer Olympics
Volleyball players at the 1996 Summer Olympics
Volleyball players at the 2000 Summer Olympics
Volleyball players at the 2004 Summer Olympics
Olympic volleyball players of Brazil
Olympic gold medalists for Brazil
Olympic medalists in volleyball
Medalists at the 2004 Summer Olympics
Volleyball players at the 2003 Pan American Games
Pan American Games bronze medalists for Brazil
People from Juiz de Fora
Brazilian volleyball coaches
Medalists at the 1992 Summer Olympics
Pan American Games medalists in volleyball
Medalists at the 2003 Pan American Games
Sportspeople from Minas Gerais